Pedro Núñez de Guzmán (12th-century) was a Seville nobleman, Lord of Guzmán.

Biography 
Pedro was the son of Nuño Perez de Guzman and Urraca Mendez de Sousa. His mother was born in Portugal, daughter of Mendo de Sousa.  He was married to Urraca García, daughter of García Ordóñez de Aza, Lord of Gumiel of Mercado.

Pedro Núñez de Guzmán was descendant of Rodrigo Muñoz de Guzmán, lord of Roa and Guzmán (Burgos).

References 

12th-century nobility from León and Castile
13th-century Castilian nobility
Spanish Roman Catholics